A group is a number of persons or things that are located, gathered, or classed together.

Groups of people
 Cultural group, a group whose members share the same cultural identity
 Ethnic group, a group whose members share the same ethnic identity
 Religious group (disambiguation), a group whose members share the same religious identity
 Social group, a group whose members share the same social identity
 Tribal group, a group whose members share the same tribal identity
 Organization, an entity that has a collective goal and is linked to an external environment
 Peer group, an entity of three or more people with similar age, ability, experience, and interest

Social science 

 In-group and out-group
 Primary, secondary, and reference groups
 Social group
 Collectives

Science and technology

Mathematics
 Group (mathematics), a set together with a binary operation satisfying certain algebraic conditions

Chemistry
 Functional group, a group of atoms which provide some property to a molecule
 Group (periodic table), a column in the periodic table of chemical elements

Computing and the Internet
 Group (computing), a collection of users or other objects
 Group (database)
 Group (online social networking)
 Usenet newsgroup
 Google Groups
 Yahoo! Groups
 Facebook groups

Other uses in science and technology
 Group (stratigraphy), in geology, consisting of formations or rock strata
 Cultivar group, in biology, a classification category in the International Code of Nomenclature for Cultivated Plants
 Galaxy groups and clusters, in cosmology
 Group (firearms), the grouping of shots from a firearm
 Language group, a unit of classification within a Language family

Other uses
 Breed Groups (dog), the group or category to which breeds of dogs are assigned by kennel clubs
 Group (auto racing), a category of car allowed to compete in auto racing
 Army group
 Militia groups
 Rebel groups
 Terrorist groups
 Group (military unit), an air force formation
 Corporate group, a group of affiliated companies
 Group psychotherapy, sometimes colloquially known as "group"
 Musical ensemble

See also
 
 Affiliation (disambiguation)
 Association (disambiguation)
 Class (disambiguation)
 Grouping (disambiguation)
 Grup (disambiguation)
 Grupp, a surname
 List of animal names, including collective nouns for groups of animals
 Principle of abstraction
 Set (disambiguation)
 Syndicate
 The Group (disambiguation)
 Union (disambiguation)